= Pseudo-Simon =

Medieval kabbalistic midrash

The Midrash of Pseudo-Simon is a medieval text by a kabbalistic scholar.
